Welikada is a suburb in Colombo, Sri Lanka. It is the location of the Welikada Maximum Security Prison.

References

Populated places in Western Province, Sri Lanka